Louardi Badjika 18 September 1957 is a retired Algerian football player.

Playing career

Club career
Born in Mellagou, Badjika started playing club football for Vauban Strasbourg during the season 1980–1981. He won the Division 3 league. Next season, he moved to SEC Bastia. During three seasons he played for RC Franc-Comtois before ending his French career in Stade de Reims. Louardi Badjika played 184 in Ligue 2 and 23 in Ligue 1.

References

1957 births
Algerian footballers
Stade de Reims players
Ligue 1 players
Ligue 2 players
Association football midfielders
Algerian expatriate footballers
Algerian expatriate sportspeople in France
Expatriate footballers in France
21st-century Algerian people
Living people